Swan Rock is a low rock lying 1.5 nautical miles (2.8 km) southwest of Cape Willems, off the west coast of Graham Land. The rock appears on an Argentine government chart of 1950. Named by the United Kingdom Antarctic Place-Names Committee (UK-APC) in 1960 for Sir Joseph Swan (1828–1914), English manufacturer who invented the carbon process for photographic printing in 1866 and pioneered gelatin dry plates for instantaneous photography, 1879–81.

Rock formations of Graham Land
Danco Coast